Paul Geoffrey Edwards (31 July 1926 – 10 May 1992) was a wide-ranging literary scholar at the University of Edinburgh, appreciated for his "adventurous and unorthodox teaching".

As a scholar of black history and literature, Edwards's work on Olaudah Equiano "helped to establish Equiano as a key figure in African and black literature in general." Edwards also wrote on Romanticism, and collaborated with Hermann Pálsson in translations of the Icelandic sagas and other books on the literature of medieval Iceland.

Life
Paul Edwards, from Birmingham, studied English at Durham University and then Celtic and Icelandic at Cambridge University. He was the Editor of Palatinate during his time at Durham, working alongside Harold Evans. After completing his education he worked in West Africa for nine years, teaching literature in Ghana and Sierra Leone. The demand of his African students for African literature propelled his encounter with Equiano.

Edwards joined the staff of Edinburgh University in 1963. Encouraged by Chinua Achebe, and helped by the historian of Sierra Leone Christopher Fyfe, in 1967 Edwards published an abridged edition of Equiano's autobiographical Narrative in Heinemann's African Writers Series, under the title Equiano's Travels. He subsequently published a facsimile version of the Narrative, and another edited version under the title The Life of Olaudah Equiano.

At the University of Edinburgh Edwards introduced a final year Honours option on "Caribbean and West African Literature", which he taught with Kenneth Ramchand. He became Reader in English Literature, and was subsequently awarded a personal chair as professor of English and African Literature at Edinburgh.

He died 10 May 1992. In March 1994 a conference entitled "Africans and Caribbeans in Britain: Writing, History, and Society" was held in his memory at Edinburgh's Centre of African Studies. A collection of essays in his memory appeared in 1998.

Works
 (ed.) West African Narrative: an anthology for schools, 1963.
 (ed.) Modern African Narrative: an anthology, 1966.
 (ed.) Through African Eyes, Cambridge: Cambridge University Press, 1966
 (ed.) Equiano's Travels: The Interesting Narrative of the Life of Olaudah Equiano or Gustavus Vassa, the African by Olaudah Equiano.  London: Heinemann, 1967. African Writers Series 10.
 (ed.) A Ballad Book for Africa, London: Faber, 1968.
 (tr. with Hermann Pálsson) Gautrek's Saga, and other medieval tales, London: University of London Press, 1968.
 (tr. with Hermann Pálsson) Arrow-Odd: a medieval novel, New York: New York University Press, 1970
 (with Hermann Pálsson) Legendary Fiction in Medieval Iceland, Reykjavík: University of Iceland, 1970
 (tr. with Hermann Pálsson) Hrolf Gautreksson, a Viking romance, Toronto: University of Toronto Press, 1972
 (tr. with Hermann Pálsson) The Book of Settlements; Landnámabók. Winnipeg: University of Manitoba, 1972
 (tr. with Hermann Pálsson) Eyrbyggja Saga, Toronto: University of Toronto Press, 1973.
 (tr. with Hermann Pálsson) Egil's Saga by Snorri Sturluson. Harmondworth: Penguin Books, 1976.
 (tr. with Hermann Pálsson) Orkneyinga Saga: the history of the Earls of Orkney, London: Hogarth Press, 1978.
 (tr. with Hermann Pálsson) Göngu-Hrólfs Saga, Edinburgh: Canongate Books, 1980.
 Black Personalities in the Era of the Slave Trade, 1983.
 (with David Dabydeen) "Black writers of the 18th and 19th centuries", in David Dabydeen (ed.), The Black Presence in English Literature, 1985, pp. 50–67.
 "Three West African Writers of the 1780s", in Charles T. Davis and Henry Louis Gates, Jr., eds, The Slave's Narrative, New York: Oxford University Press, 1985.
 (tr. with Hermann Pálsson) Seven Viking Romances, Harmondsworth: Penguin, 1985.
 (tr. with Hermann Pálsson) Knytlinga Saga: the history of the kings of Denmark, Odense: Odense University Press, 1986.
 (tr. with Hermann Pálsson) Magnus' Saga: the life of St Magnus, Earl of Orkney, 1075–1116, Oxford: Perpetua, 1987.
 (tr. with Hermann Pálsson) Vikings in Russia: Yngvar's saga and Eymund's saga, Edinburgh: Edinburgh University Press, 1989.
 (ed. with David Dabydeen) Black Writers in Britain: 1760–1830, 1991.
 (ed. with Polly Rewt) The letters of Ignatius Sancho by Ignatius Sancho, Edinburgh: University of Edinburgh Press, 1994.

References

1926 births
1992 deaths
British literary historians
Icelandic–English translators
Academics of the University of Edinburgh
Alumni of the University of Cambridge
Alumni of Hatfield College, Durham
20th-century translators